Maswarah District  is a district of the Al Bayda Governorate, Yemen. As of 2003, the district had a population of 7,038 inhabitants.

Localities 
 Al-Hijra

References

Districts of Al Bayda Governorate
Maswarah District